Christopher Charles Collins (born Christopher Lawrence Latta; August 30, 1949 – June 12, 1994) was an American actor and stand-up comedian. He is best known as the voice of Cobra Commander in the G.I. Joe animated series and Starscream in the first Transformers animated series. He had a few guest roles in the Star Trek series The Next Generation and Deep Space Nine, he voice acted Moe Szyslak and Mr. Burns in the first season of The Simpsons (1989–1990), and he had many other roles in television series and films. He also had a successful stand-up comedy career.

Early life
Christopher Lawrence Latta was born in Orange, New Jersey to Robert Latta, a New York stage actor, and Jane Morin, an advertising executive. He grew up in the Morningside Heights (sometimes called "West Harlem") section of Manhattan, New York City. His legal name became Christopher Charles Collins when his stepfather adopted him. In his stand-up routine, he claimed to have grown up in Harlem and said his ultra-liberal parents had moved the family there "so he could meet some Negroes".

After a year at New York University, he studied acting, dance, voice, and mime.

Career

Radio work and stand-up comedy
In the mid-1970s, he acted on the New York and Boston stage and did voice-over work for Boston radio station WBCN.

Collins's stand-up career peaked in the late 1980s and early 1990s, when he performed in most of the major comedy venues in the United States and Canada. In 1990, he won the San Francisco International Stand-Up Comedy Competition.

At the beginning of his act, he entered in a black trench coat and ordered the audience to applaud the person who introduced him. He picked an audience member who failed to applaud and told him he had to "clap alone". He told the audience he was not a comedian, but a "psychotic who learned to market his problem". His comic persona was a loud, angry, mentally unstable man who liked to intimidate the audience. He was a frequent featured performer on An Evening at the Improv and Caroline's Comedy Hour.

Voice acting
Collins made his animation voice acting debut as one of the English dubbers of the 1979 anime series Space Battleship Yamato (also called Star Blazers). He was most recognizable in that series as the voice of space marine Sgt. Knox during the Comet Empire installment.

When he began regular voice work, he adopted the stage name Chris Latta, as another Screen Actors Guild actor was performing as Chris Collins.

In 1983, Collins began voicing Cobra Commander for a five-part G.I. Joe animated mini-series. He continued voicing the role in a second five-part animated mini-series in 1984, a regular animated series beginning in 1985, a 1987 direct-to-video animated movie and a 1989 animated series. Starting in 1984, Collins voiced the Decepticon Starscream for the Transformers animated series. He voiced other G.I. Joe and Transformers characters in these series as well as in toy commercials. These included the Autobot scientist Wheeljack, the Autobots' human friend Sparkplug Witwicky, the G.I. Joe Marine Gung-Ho and the Dreadnok Ripper. In Inhumanoids, he voiced D'Compose and Tendril. In Visionaries: Knights of the Magical Light, he voiced Darkstorm and Cravex. He provided voices in The Real Ghostbusters, credited as Chris Collins. He played the live-action role of King Koopa in King Koopa's Kool Kartoons in 1989 before the role was taken over by Patrick Pinney.

In The Simpsons, Collins originated the voice of Mr. Burns in the first-season episodes "Simpsons Roasting on an Open Fire", "The Telltale Head", and "Homer's Odyssey", and recorded lines as Moe Szyslak for "The Telltale Head" and "Some Enchanted Evening" (but was dubbed over in the latter). Along with several other early Simpsons voice actors, he left during the first season. Hank Azaria took over the voice of Moe, while Harry Shearer assumed the role of Mr. Burns. In a 2018 interview with GQ, Azaria commented on replacing Collins as Moe, saying that he did not find out until years later that he had replaced another actor. Azaria said that when he asked why he had replaced Collins, he was told by Matt Groening, "He (Collins) was great... He was just a dick.  His voice was great, he was just kind of jerky to everyone." Azaria continued, "Think about how awful—that guy could have been on The Simpsons his whole life. Lesson to you kids: Always be nice!"

Live action
Later in the 1980s, he adopted the stage name of Christopher Collins and acted in many live-action television series and motion pictures. In Star Trek: The Next Generation, he played Klingon Captain Kargan in the episode "A Matter of Honor" and Pakled Captain Grebnedlog in the episode "Samaritan Snare". In Star Trek: Deep Space Nine, he portrayed two different Markalians: Durg in "The Passenger", and an unnamed assistant to The Albino in "Blood Oath". In Married... with Children, he played Roger, one of Al Bundy's bowling buddies and a member of NO MA'AM (National Organization of Men Against Amazonian Masterhood). He portrayed a mugger on an episode of Seinfeld titled "The Subway". He appears as Mr. Forbes in a first-season episode of NYPD Blue titled "Abandando Abandoned".

His first live-action feature film appearance is a bit part as the sharing husband in the film Road House. He appeared in True Identity, Stop! Or My Mom Will Shoot, Blue Desert, and A Stranger Among Us.

On April 28, 2012, Collins was posthumously inducted into the Transformers Hall of Fame. His daughter Abigail accepted on his behalf.

Personal life
Collins married twice and had three children. Early in his career, he divided his time between New York, Boston, and Los Angeles before settling in L.A. in 1983. In 1991, he moved to Ventura, California.

In an interview, Flint Dille recalled:

Death
Collins was diagnosed with cerebral hemorrhage in April 1992. He died on June 12, 1994, at the age of 44, due to complications of the hemorrhage.

Filmography

Star Blazers (1979, TV Series) – Comet Empire General Dire / Sergeant Knox
G.I. Joe: A Real American Hero (1983, TV Mini-Series) – Cobra Commander / Gung-Ho / Breaker / Steeler (voice)
Pac-Man (1983, TV Series) – (voice)
Spider-Man and His Amazing Friends (1983, TV Series) – Beetle / Sandman (voice)
The Transformers (1984–1987, TV Series) – Starscream / Wheeljack / Sparkplug Witwicky / Laserbeak / Buzzsaw / Reflector / Defensor / Furg / Krunk (voice)
G.I. Joe: The Revenge of Cobra (1984, TV Mini-Series) – Cobra Commander / Gung-Ho / Ripper (voice)
Bigfoot and the Muscle Machines (1985) – Adrian Ravenscrodr / Ernie Slye (voice)
The Transformers: The Movie (1986, TV Series) – Starscream / Laserbeak (voice, uncredited)
G.I. Joe: A Real American Hero (1985, TV Series) – Cobra Commander / Gung-Ho / Breaker / Steeler / Ripper / Horrorshow / Frostbite (voice)
Inhumanoids (1986, TV Series) – D'Compose / Tendril / Statesman Granahue (voice)
The Blinkins: The Bear and the Blizzard (1986, TV Movie) – Slime (voice)
Inhumanoids: The Movie (1986) – D'Compose / Granahue / Tendril (voice)
G.I. Joe: The Movie (1987) – Cobra Commander / Gung-Ho / Ripper (voice)
Visionaries: Knights of the Magical Light (1987, TV Series) – Darkstorm / Cravex / Falkama (voice)
The Real Ghostbusters (1987–1990, TV Series) – Sammy K. Ferret (voice)
This Is America, Charlie Brown (1988, TV Mini-Series) – Sailor (voice)
Superman (1988, TV Series) – (voice)
Mr. Belvedere (1988, TV Series) – Tom
Mama's Family (1989, TV Series) – Larry McCary
Star Trek: The Next Generation (1989, TV Series) – Captain Grebnedlog and Captain Kargan
Road House (1989) – Sharing Husband
Anything But Love (1989, TV Series) – Charles
King Koopa's Kool Kartoons (1989, TV Series) – King Koopa
G.I. Joe: Operation Dragonfire (1989, TV Mini-Series) – Cobra Commander (voice, uncredited)
The Simpsons (1989–1990, TV Series) – Mr. Burns (voice) / Moe Szyslak (voice)
G.I. Joe: A Real American Hero (1990–1992, TV Series) – Cobra Commander (voice)
Blue Desert (1991) – Phone Man
Doogie Howser, M.D. (1991, TV Series) – Mr. Stapleton
Rover Dangerfield (1991) – Big Boss / Coyote / Sparky / Wolf / Horse (voice)
True Identity (1991) – Frank LaMotta
Danger Team (1991, TV Movie) – Truk (voice)
Seinfeld (1992, TV Series) – Thug
Stop! Or My Mom Will Shoot (1992) – Gang Member
A Stranger Among Us (1992) – Chris Baldessari
The Golden Palace (1992, TV Series) – Angel
Civil Wars (1992, TV Series) – P.J. Stone
Star Trek: Deep Space Nine (1993–1994, TV Series) – Guard and Durg
Married... with Children (1993–1994, TV Series) – Roger
NYPD Blue (1994, TV Series) – Paul Forbes

References

External links

 
 

1949 births
1994 deaths
20th-century American comedians
20th-century American male actors
American male film actors
American male television actors
American male voice actors
American stand-up comedians
Comedians from New York City
Male actors from New Jersey
Male actors from New York City
New York University alumni
People from Harlem
People from Orange, New Jersey